When One Grows Old is an 1881 Oil-on-canvas painting by Dutch artist Jozef Israëls. The subject of the painting is an old woman warming herself by a fireplace.

History
In 1871 Jozef Israëls moved to The Hague. In 1881 he completed the painting When One Grows Old. In Dutch, the painting is known as Als men oud wordt. The painting is housed at the Kunstmuseum Den Haag and it is on loan from Erven van Hijmans van Wadenoyen.

Description
The painting is of an old peasant woman who is warming herself by a fireplace. The painting depicts a contemplative stillness. The old woman is hunched over with her back bent and her hands stretched out toward the fireplace.

Reception
In the book Jozef Israëls author John Ernest Phythian states that the painting sums up Israëls techniques as a painter. His image of the woman (as with his other peasant subjects) is a portrayal of a peasant who is not at work.

References

19th-century paintings
1870s paintings
Paintings by Jozef Israëls